Oriental University is a private university in Indore, Madhya Pradesh, India. It was established in 2011.

History 
People's University was established on May 4, 2011, through the Madhya Pradesh Niji Vishwavidyalay(Sthapana Ewam Sanchalan) Sanshodhan Adhiniyam, 2011, which also established People's University and ITM University.

References

External links
Official website

Private universities in India
Universities in Madhya Pradesh
Universities and colleges in Indore
2011 establishments in Madhya Pradesh
Educational institutions established in 2011